Jennie Lakes Wilderness is a protected area in the Sierra Nevada, in Tulare County, California. Jennie Lakes Wilderness is about nine square miles within the Sequoia National Forest, that was established by the California Wilderness Act of 1984, and added to the National Wilderness Preservation System.

The Jennie Lakes Wilderness is a classic high Sierra landscape. It is a 10,500 acre area with a mixture of lakes, mountain peaks, forests, meadows and streams, most of which is above  in elevation. The wilderness contains variations of alpine and sub-alpine forest. Lodgepole Pines, Red and White Firs and White (Mountain) Pine dominate the area, while Jeffrey Pines and a few juniper are also present. In the summer, wildflowers are common.

In the Jennie Lakes Wilderness, there are two principal lakes, Jennie Ellis Lake and Weaver Lake. Both lakes tend to be busy on weekends (especially holidays). Weaver Lake attracts many day hikers as it lies close to the trailhead. Jennie Lake is often a stop for hikers coming from or going into Sequoia National Park to the south. Smaller and more remote, there is also a pond above JO Pass about a mile east of Jennie Lake and "Poison Pond" sits about a half-mile south of Weaver Lake. Both have a few campsites around them.

Geography
Jennie Lakes Wilderness is situated immediately north of Sequoia National Park and west of Kings Canyon National Park. The eastern half is a high plateau bounded by a ridge and the western half is dominated by Shell Mountain  as well as Weaver Lake. Boulder Creek flows from Jennie Lake and is a major tributary to the South Fork Kings River. Stony Creek begins south of Shell Mountain and flows into the North Fork Kaweah River.

Ecology
Red fir and lodgepole pine are the primary forest cover with granitic outcroppings typical of the Sierra Nevada Mountains. Black bears are common in the area.

Recreation
Recreational activities include day hiking, backpacking, horsepacking, fishing, and cross-country skiing. There are four trailheads that give access to 26 miles of trails as well as connecting walkers to the Sequoia & Kings Canyon National Park's backcountry - Big Meadow, Rowell Meadow, Marvin Pass and Stony Creek.

The Forest Service encourages the practice of Leave No Trace principles of outdoor travel to minimize human impact on the environment. Campers are expected to avoid camping within 100' of either of the main lakes. Due to growing overuse, a Forest Order is in effect during the busy summer season to help protect the riparian areas near the lakeshores.

See also
 List of plants of the Sierra Nevada (U.S.)

References

Footnotes
Adkinson, Ron Wild Northern California. The Globe Pequot Press, 2001

External links
 Hume Lake Ranger District Wilderness: unofficial website
 USDA Forest Service: Sequoia National Forest Wilderness Areas
 Wilderness.net: Jennie Lakes Wilderness website
 Photo of Jennie Lake.

Wilderness areas of California
Protected areas of the Sierra Nevada (United States)
Protected areas of Tulare County, California
Sequoia National Forest
1984 establishments in California